Katie Williams (born 24 May 1984) is a former footballer who played for the Welsh national team and Liverpool. Williams played as a central defender and accumulated twenty caps for Wales.

Club career
Williams began her career at home-town club Bangor City, before moving on to Tranmere Rovers and Blackburn Rovers. She spent the 2008 off-season in the American W-League with the Fredericksburg Lady Gunners but suffered a damaged cruciate ligament. Williams also played for Caernarfon Town in the North Wales Women's Football League in 2015/2016 season.

On her recovery she joined Liverpool. In February 2011 Williams remained registered to Liverpool, but she was not included in the club's 2011 FA WSL squad.

International career
Williams won six caps for Wales at U19 level. She made her senior debut in a 3–2 Algarve Cup win over Portugal in March 2004.

References

External links
Katie Williams at UEFA
Katie Williams at FAW

1984 births
Living people
Footballers from Bangor, Gwynedd
Welsh women's footballers
Liverpool F.C. Women players
Tranmere Rovers L.F.C. players
Blackburn Rovers L.F.C. players
Wales women's international footballers
FA Women's National League players
Women's association football defenders
Fredericksburg Lady Gunners players
USL W-League (1995–2015) players
Welsh expatriate sportspeople in the United States
Expatriate women's soccer players in the United States